This is a list of marinas in various countries.

Albania
Orikum Marina, Orikum, Vlore

Australia

New South Wales
Sydney
Empire Marina Bobbin Head
Akuna Bay Marina
Berowra Waters
Blakehurst Marina
Woolwich Marina
Cabarita Point
Darling Harbour Marina
Dolans Bay Marina
River Quays Marina
Rushcutters Bay Marina
The Spit at Mosman
Coffs Harbour
Nelson Bay
Batemans Bay
Kearnzy
Glouscester Marina Weaver
Shellharbour Marina

Queensland
South East Queensland
Gold Coast
Gold Coast City Marina
Southport Yacht Club
Hope Harbour Marina
Sanctuary Cove Marina
Horizon Shores Marina
Brisbane
Scarborough Marina
Gardens Point Marina
Dockside Marina, Kangaroo Point
Newport Waterways Marina, Moreton Bay
Heron's Moorings, Hemmant
Waterfront Place Marina, Eagle Street Pier
East Coast Marina, Manly
Cleveland Marina
Raby Bay Marina
Queensland Cruising Yacht Club
Sunshine Coast
Noosa Harbour Marina
Kawana Waters Marina
Mooloolaba Marina
Central Queensland
Mackay Marina
Gladstone Marina
Bundaberg Port Marina
Hervey Bay Marina
Urangan Boat Harbour
Rosslyn Bay Marina
Keppel Bay Marina
Whitsundays
Hamilton Island Marina
Hayman Island Marina
Shute Harbour Marina
Abel Point Marina
North Queensland
The Breakwater Marina, Townsville
Townsville Motorboat and Yacht Club
Half Moon Bay Marina, Yorkeys Knob
Cairns Marlin Marina
Crystalbrook Superyacht Marina, Port Douglas

South Australia
 Adelaide metropolitan waterfront:
 Gulf Point Marina, North Haven
 Holdfast Shores Marina, Glenelg
 Newport Quays Marina, Port Adelaide
 Copper Cove Marina, Wallaroo
 Hindmarsh Island Marina
 Lake Butler Marina, Robe
 Marina St. Vincent, Wirrina Cove
 Port Lincoln Marina
 Port Vincent Marina
 Tumby Bay Marina

Tasmania
Margate Marina, Barretta, Tasmania

Victoria
Melbourne Metropolitan & Port Phillip
VicUrban Marina, New Quay, Melbourne Docklands
YE Marina, Yarra's Edge, Melbourne Docklands
Melbourne City Marina, Melbourne Docklands
St Kilda Marina, St Kilda, Victoria
Pier 35 Marina, Port Melbourne
Sandringham Yacht Club Marina, Sandringham, Victoria
Brighton Yacht Club Marina, Brighton, Victoria
Blairgowrie Yacht Squadron Marina, Blairgowrie, Victoria
Parsons Marina, Williamstown
Anchorage Marina, Williamstown
Williamstown Yacht Club Marina, Williamstown
Peninsula Marina, Seaford
Whalers Cove Marina
Patterson Lakes Marina
 Regional
Port Fairy Marina
Bay City Marina, Geelong
Queenscliff Marina
Western Port Marina, Hastings, Western Port Bay
Yaringa Boat Harbour Marina, Sommerville, Western Port Bay
Lakes Entrance Marina, Lakes Entrance
Port of Sale Marina, Sale
Loch Sport Marina, Loch Sport

Western Australia
 Mindarie Keys, Mindarie
 Hillarys Boat Harbour, Hillarys
 Mandurah Ocean Marina, Mandurah
 Port Bouvard Marina, Wannanup
 Two Rocks Marina, Two Rocks
 Albany Waterfront, Albany
 Batavia Coast Marina, Geraldton
 Port Geographe Marina, Geographe

Northern Territory
Darwin
CullenBay
Tipperary Waters Marina
Bay View

Azerbaijan
Baku Marina
Port of Baku

Barbados

Saint Peter
Port Saint Charles, Six Men's Bay
Port Ferdinand, Retreat

Belgium
 Vlaamse Yachthaven Nieuwpoort

Cambodia
Marina Oceania, Sihanoukville Autonomous Port

Canada

British Columbia

Sunshine Coast
Sunshine Coast of Canada

Gabriola Island
Silva Bay Resort & Marina, British Columbia]]

Burrard Inlet
Reed Point Marina

Quadra Island
Quadra Island

Maple Bay

Maple Bay Marina, Maple Bay

Manitoba

Lake Winnipeg
 Gimli Harbour, Gimli
 Silver Harbour, Gimli
 Riverton Marina, Riverton

Nova Scotia

Cape Breton Island

Bras d'Or Lake
Baddeck Marine, Baddeck
Barra Strait Marina (Grand Narrows), Grand Narrows (Barra Strait)
Ben Eoin Marina, Ben Eoin (East Bay)
Bras d'Or Yacht Club, Baddeck
Cape Breton Boatyard (Baddeck), Baddeck
St Peter's Lions Club Marina, St. Peter's

East Coast / Cabot Strait
Ingonish Landing (South Ingonish Harbour)

Sydney Harbour
Dobson Yacht Club, Westmount (Sydney)
Northern Yacht Club, North Sydney
Royal Cape Breton Yacht Club, Sydney

Eastern Shore, Strait of Canso & Lennox Passage
Isle Madame Boat Club, Arichat
Lennox Passage Yacht Club, D'Escousse
Port Hawkesbury Marina, Port Hawkesbury

Halifax and area
 Armdale Yacht Club, Northwest Arm
 Dartmouth Yacht Club, Wright's Cove
 Bedford Basin Yacht Club, Bedford
 Royal Nova Scotia Yacht Squadron, Northwest Arm
 Shearwater Yacht Club, Shearwater (Dartmouth)

South Shore 
 Chester Yacht Club, Chester
 LaHave River Yacht Club, Lahave
 Lunenburg Yacht Club, Lunenburg
 Shelburne Harbour Yacht Club and Marina, Shelburne
 Mahone Bay Civic Marina, Mahone Bay, Nova Scotia

Western Shore/Fundy Coast

Northumberland Strait
Ballantynes Cove, Ballantynes Cove
Sunrise Shore Marina, (Home of Barrachois Harbour Yacht Club), Tatamagouche

Ontario

Lake Nipissing
Starlite Marina, Sturgeon Falls

Great Lakes

Lake Huron

St. Clair River/Lake St. Clair/Detroit River
Windsor Yacht Club, Windsor

Georgian Bay
Bay Port Yachting Centre, Midland
Wye Heritage Marina, Midland

North Channel
Bellevue Marina, Sault Ste. Marie
Blind River Marina, Blind River
Hilton Beach Marina, Hilton Beach (St. Joseph Island)
Richard's Landing Marina, Richard's Landing (St. Joseph Island)
Roberta Bondar Transient Marina, Sault Ste. Marie

Ottawa River
Britannia Yacht Club, Ottawa
Nepean Sailing Club, Ottawa

Lake Ontario
Collins Bay Marina, Kingston
Kingston Yacht Club, Kingston
Portsmouth Harbour, Kingston

Lake Simcoe
Friday Harbour Resort Marina, Innisfil, Ontario

Lake Superior
Gitchee Gumee Marina, Haviland Bay
Bellevue Marina, Sault Ste. Marie
Roberta Bondar Transient Marina, Sault Ste. Marie
Buck's Marina, Wawa

Lake Erie
MacDonald Turkey Point Marina, Turkey Point

Croatia

There are around 50 marinas operating in Croatia, 21 of them as part of the Adriatic Croatia International (ACI) marina chain.

Spinut Marina, Split
ACI Marina Split, Split
ACI Marina Pula, Pula
ACI Marina Umag, Umag
Marina Punat, Punat

Cyprus
Limassol Marina, Limassol

Dominican Republic

Las Cabuyas
Aramis Marina & Yacht Club, San Pedro de Macorís Province

Egypt
Hurghada Marina Boulevard, Hurghada
Abu Tig Marina, El Gouna, Hurghada
San Stefano Marina, Alexandria
Porto Marina
Porto Sokhna
Marsa El-geezah
Sidi Abdel Rahman
Ras Gharib

Finland
Kuopio Marina, Kuopio

Germany
(number of spots for ships added)

Brandenburg 
Hohen Neuendorf – Marina Havelbaude
Rheinsberg (Kleinzerlang) – Marina Wolfsbruch, 190 spots for vessels

Berlin 
Bootsstände Angermann, 250 
Marina Lanke, 270 
Verein Seglerhaus am Wannsee

Baden-Württemberg
Kressbronn am Bodensee – Ultramarin, 1500

Bavaria
Bernried – Marina Bernried, 270

Marinas in Hesse
Wiesbaden – Schiersteiner Hafen

Hamburg
Yachthafen – 2000

Mecklenburg & Western Pomerania
Hohe Düne, Rostock – Yachthafen Hohe Düne, 750
Kühlungsborn – Bootshafen|
Rechlin – Marina Müritz (Hafendorf Müritz), 350
Stralsund – Citymarina Stralsund, 300
Usedom – Yachthafen Karlshagen
Warnemünde (Rostock) – Dalben 21
Warnemünde – Schnatermann
Wolgast – Dreilindengrund

Lower Saxony
Emden – Yachthafen "Alter Binnenhafen/Ratsdelft", 100
Emden – Yachthafen "Außenhafen Emden", 60
Hannover – Yachthafen Hannover

Northrhine-Westphalia
Bergkamen – Marina Rünthe, 280
Duisburg – Marina, 133
Emmerich am Rhein – Porta Marina, 420
Leverkusen – Yacht-Club Leverkusen-Hitdorf e.V., 50
Köln-Zündorf – Groov
Recke (Westfalen) – Marina Recke, Mittellandkanal
Wesel – Yachthafen

Schleswig-Holstein
Bohnert – Marina Hülsen, 68
Fehmarn – Burg auf Fehmarn
Flensburg – Museumshafen Flensburg
Heiligenhafen – Marina Heiligenhafen, 1000
Helgoland – Yachthafen
Kiel – Sport harbours at Kieler Förde, 2200
Laboe (Kiel) – Yachthafen
Lübeck – Marina Baltica, 210
Neustadt in Holstein – ancora Marina
Sylt – Hafen Rantum
Timmendorfer Strand – Niendorfer Hafen
Uetersen – Klosterdeich/Stichhafen

Greece
In Greece there are a total of 50 marinas operating and 20 more are under construction.

Athens Metropolitan Area
 Agios Kosmas Marina, Hellinikon, Attica
 Alimos Marina, Alimos, Attica
 Athens Marina (formerly Faliro Marina), Phaleron, Attica
 Flisvos Marina, Piraeus, Attica
 Vouliagmeni Marina, Vouliagmeni, Attica
 Glyfada Marinas (Glyfada Marina A, Glyfada Marina B, Glyfada Marina C), Glyfada, Attica
 Methana Marina, Methana, Attica
 Olympic Marine, Lavrio, Attica
 Marina Zea, Piraeus, Attica
 Marina Tzitzifies, Kallithea, Attica
 Schoinias Marina, Schoinias, Attica

Crete
 Agios Nikolaos Marina, Agios Nikolaos, Crete
 Herakleion Marina, Herakleion, Crete
 Chania Marina, Chania, Crete
 Elounda Marina, Elounda, Greece
 Rethymnon Marina, Rethymnon, Crete
 Souda Marina, Souda, Crete

Cyclades
 Tinos Marina, Tinos

Dodecanese
 Lakki Marina, Leros
 Rhodes Marina

Ionian Islands
 Marina of Lefkas, Lefkas

Macedonia
 Kalamaria Marina, Kalamaria, Thessaloniki
 Nautical Club of Thessaloniki, Kalamaria, Thessaloniki
 Nea Krini, Kalamaria, Thessaloniki
 Sailing Club of Thessaloniki, Thessaloniki
 Porto Carras, Chalkidiki
 Kavala Marina, Kavala

Peloponnese
 Kalamata Marina, Kalamata
 Marina of Patras, Patras

Ireland — whole island
Sailing south from NE corner of island:

East Coast
Carrickfergus Marina
Bangor Marina
Copeland Marina
Ardglass Marina (also known as Phennick Cove Marina)
Portaferry Marina
Carlingford Marina
Malahide Marina, Dublin
Howth Yacht Club Marina, Dublin
Pool Beg Marina, Dublin
Dublin City Moorings
Dun Laoghaire Marina, Dublin
Arklow Marina, Wicklow

South Coast
Kilmore Quay, Wexford
Waterford City Marina, Waterford
Three Sisters Marina, New Ross, Wexford  Upriver/Inland
Salve Marina, Crosshaven, Cork
Crosshaven Boatyard Marina, Cork
Royal Cork Yacht Club Marina, Cork
Castlepark Marina, Kinsale, Cork
Trident Marina, Kinsale, Cork
East Ferry Marina, Great Island, Cork
Kinsale Marina, Kinsale, Cork

West Coast
Cahersiveen Marina, Cahersiveen, Kerry
Lawrence's Cove Marina, Bere Island, Cork
Dingle Marina, Dingle, Kerry
Fenit Marina, Tralee, Kerry
Kilrush Marina, Kilrush, Clare
Galway Harbour Marina, Galway, Galway

River Shannon and inland marinas
Athlone Marina
Hanley's Marina, Lanesborough
Shamrock Marina Esker Banagher

North Coast
Lough Swilly Marina
Ballycastle Marina
Glenarm Marina
Portrush Marina
Rathlin Island Marina
Coleraine Marina
Seatons Marina
Foyle Marina

India
Kochi International Marina

Indonesia
Nongsa Point Marina (Batam)
Marina Del Ray (Gili Gede, Lombok)

Israel

Mediterranean Sea
Blue Marina, Ashdod
Ashqelon
Herzliya
Tel-Aviv
Haifa
Akko

Red Sea
Eilat

Hong Kong

Hong Kong Island
Royal Hong Kong Yacht Club, Causeway Bay (branches at Middle Island & Shelter Cove)
Aberdeen Boat Club Sham Wan, Aberdeen Harbour (buoy moorings only, branch at Middle I)
Aberdeen Marina Club, Sham Wan

New Territories
Discovery Bay Marina Club, Nim Shue Wan, Discovery Bay, Lantau Island
Club Marina Cove, Ho Chung, Sai Kung district
Hong Kong Marina, Pak Wai, Sai Kung district
Hebe Haven Yacht Club Pak Sha Wan, Sai Kung (buoy moorings only)
Clear Water Bay Golf & Country Club Marina, Po Toi O, near Clear Water Bay
Gold Coast Yacht & Country Club Marina, Tuen Mun district

Lebanon
Zaitunay Bay, Beirut
La Marina, Dbayeh
El Mina
ATCL Marina, Kaslik, Jounieh
Tripoli

Malaysia
Miri Marina
Perak Marina (Marina Island Pangkor)
Sebana Cove Resort Marina
Puteri Harbour Marina
Senibong Cove Marina
Straits Quay, Penang
Tanjung City Marina, Penang

Malta
Grand Harbour Marina, Vittoriosa Marina, Vittoriosa
Manoel Island Marina
Mġarr Harbour Marina, Għajnsielem, Gozo
Msida Marina, Msida
Portomaso Marina, St Julian's

Mexico
Marina Nuevo Vallarta
Puerto Salina

Montenegro
Porto Montenegro, Tivat

Netherlands
Zeewolde – Jachthaven De Eemhof
Jachthaven Biesbosch,

New Zealand

Opua
Opua Marina, Bay of Islands

Whangarei
Whangarei Marina

Auckland
Bayswater Marina
Clearwater Cove
Gulf Harbour Marina
Half Moon Bay Marina
Hobsonville Marina
Westhaven Marina, biggest marina of the Southern Hemisphere

Whitianga
Whitianga Marina, Coromandel

Tauranga
Harbour Bridge Marina
Tauranga Marina, Sulphur Point

Gisborne
Gisborne Tatapouri Sports Fishing Club

Napier
Napier Sailing Club Inc.

Port Nicholson, Wellington
Chaffers Marina, Wellington City
Evans Bay Marina, Wellington
Seaview Marina, Lower Hutt

Mana
Mana Marina, Paremata, Wellington

Marlborough Sounds
Havelock Marina, Havelock
Picton Marina
Waikawa Bay Marina, nr Picton

Nelson
Nelson Marina

Lyttelton Harbour (for Christchurch)
Try Lyttelton Port

Dunedin
Otago Yacht Club
Port Chalmers Yacht Club

Philippines
 Abanico Yacht Club Puerto Princesa
 Bohol Yacht Club
 Busuanga Yacht Club Coron, Palawan
 Cebu Yacht Club
 Davao Boat and Leisure Club
 Iloilo Sailing Club
 Manila Yacht Club
 Maya Maya Yacht Club Nasugbu, Batangas
 Puerto Galera Yacht Club
 Punta Fuego Yacht Club
 Santa Ana Yacht Club Santa Ana, Cagayan
 Subic Bay Yacht Club
 Taal Lake Yacht Club

Poland
Gdynia – Biggest Marina in Poland.
Gdańsk
Hel
Łeba
Puck
Szczecin
Trzebież
Władysławowo
Wrocław

Portugal
 Azores
 Angra do Heroísmo (Terceira Island)
 Horta (Faial Island) – 4th most visited marina in the world
 Ponta Delgada (São Miguel Island)
 Praia (Graciosa Island)
 Praia da Vitória (Terceira Island)
 Velas (São Jorge Island)
 Vila Franca do Campo (São Miguel Island)
 Vila do Porto (Santa Maria Island)
 Albufeira – Marina de Albufeira
 Cascais – Cascais Marina
 Lagos – Marina de Lagos
 Lisboa – Marina Parque das Nações Portugal
 Porto - Marina de Leixões
 Porto - Marina da Póvoa
 Porto - Marina do Freixo
 Porto - Douro Marina
 Portimão – Maria de Portimão
 Vilamoura – Marina de Vilamoura

Romania
 Limanu

Singapore
Marina at Keppel Bay (Singapore)

Slovenia
Marina Izola
Marina Koper
Marina Portorož

Spain
Empuriabrava

Thailand
 Ocean Marina Yacht Club, Pattaya
 Phuket Boat Lagoon, Phuket
Royal Phuket Marina, Phuket
Phuket Yacht Haven

Turkey and Northern Cyprus
for the main article, see Marinas in Turkey

 Antalya Province
Setur Antalya Marina, Antalya
Setur Finike Marina, Finike
Park Kemer Marina, Kemer
 Aydın Province
D-Marin Didim, Didim
Setur Kuşadası Marina, Kuşadası
 Balıkesir Province
Setur Ayvalık Marina, Ayvalık
 Istanbul Province
Ataköy Marina, Ataköy – Bakırköy (Istanbul, European part)
Setur Kalamış & Fenerbahçe Marina, Kalamış and Fenerbahçe (two adjacent marinas) – Kadıköy (Istanbul, Asian part)
Viaport Marina, Tuzla – Tuzla (Istanbul, Asian part)
 Izmir Province
Alaçatı Marina, Alaçatı, Çeşme
Setur Çeşme Altınyunus Marina, Çeşme
Levent İzmir Marina, İnciraltı, İzmir
 Muğla Province
Palmarina Bodrum, Yalıkavak – Bodrum
Club Marina, Göcek – Fethiye
Port Göcek, Göcek – Fethiye
Fethiye Ece Marina, Fethiye
Milta Bodrum Marina, Bodrum
Port Bodrum Yalıkavak, Yalıkavak – Bodrum
Port Atami, Göltürkbükü – Bodrum
D-Marin Turgutreis, Turgutreis – Bodrum
Marmaris Netsel Marina, Marmaris
Marmaris Yatmarin, Marmaris
Albatros Marina, Marmaris
Martı Marina, Marmaris
 Northern Cyprus
Girne Marina, Girne (Kyrenia)
Delta Marina, Gazimağusa (Famagusta)

United Arab Emirates

Dubai
Dubai Marina
Alkhor Marina – under construction

United Kingdom

Suffolk, East Anglia
Port of Lowestoft (marina)
Fambridge Yacht Haven, River Crouch

South Coast
WicorMarine Yacht Haven
Brixham Marina
Hamble Point Marina
Burnham Yacht Harbour
Tewkesbury Marina
Gosport Marina
Haven Quay Lymington Dry Stack
Haslar Marina
Southsea Marina
Chichester Marina
Port Solent
Littlehampton Marina
Brighton Marina
Weymouth Marina
Weymouth and Portland National Sailing Academy
Portland Marina
Lymington Berthon
Lymington Yacht Haven
Lymington Harbour Master
Hythe
Poole Cobbs Quay
Smedley Marina
Sovereign Harbour
Eastbourne
Ramsgate
Island Harbour Marina
Thornham Marina

London
Gallions Point Marina
Limehouse Marina
South Dock Marina
St Katherine Haven
West India Docks Marina

Non-tidal Thames
Bourne End Marina
Bray Marina
Eyot House Marina
Hambleden Mill Marina
Penton Hook Marina
Racecourse Marina
Shepperton Marina
Teddington Harbour
Thames Ditton Marina
Thames and Kennet Marina
Walton Marina
Windsor Marina

Thames Estuary
Leigh Marina
Embankment Marina

River Medway
Chatham Maritime Marina
Gillingham Marina
Hoo Marina
Medway Bridge Marina
Port Medway Marina
Whitton Marine

Non-tidal Medway
Hampstead Marina
Medway Wharf Marina
Fords Wharf Boatyard

Inland
Apsley Marina, Grand Union Canal
Cowroast Marina, Grand Union Canal
Crick Marina, Grand Union Canal
Bredon Marina, River Avon
Priory Marina, River Great Ouse
Royal Quays Marina, River Tyne
Springfield Marina, River Lea

South West England
Bristol Harbour Marina
Exmouth Marina
Falmouth Marina (operated by Premier Marinas)
Plymouth Yacht Haven
Yacht Haven Quay Plymouth, Dry Stack Marina
Portishead Marina
Portland Marina
Mylor Harbour Marina
Watchet Harbour Marina
Weymouth Marina

Northern England
Barrow Marina, Barrow-in-Furness
Hartlepool Marina, Hartlepool
Hull Marina, Kingston upon Hull
Liverpool Marina, Liverpool
Sunderland Marina, Sunderland

Wales
Cardiff Marina, Cardiff
Aberystwyth Marina, Aberystwyth
Burry Port Marina, Burry Port
Conwyn Marina, Conwy
Hafan Pwllheli, Pwllheli
Holyhead Marina, Holyhead
Lawrenny Quay Hotel & Yacht Station, Kilgetty
Mermaid Quay, Cardiff
Fishguard & Goodwick Marina, Fishguard (proposed)
Neyland Yacht Haven, Neyland
Pembroke Marina, Pembroke
Penarth Marina, Vale of Glamorgan
Swansea Marina, Swansea

Northern Ireland
Belfast Lough
Bangor Marina
Belfast Marina
Carrickfergus Marina
Ardglass Marina, Ardglass
Portaferry Marina, Strangford Lough

Scotland
Troon Yacht Haven, Ayrshire
Kip Marina, Clyde
Ardfern Marina, Loch Craignish
Craobh Marina, Lochgilphead
Holy Loch Marina, Sandbank, Argyll and Bute, by Dunoon
Port Edgar Marina, Firth of Forth
Largs Yacht Haven, Clyde
Ardrossan Marina, Clyde
Portavadie, Loch Fyne

Channel Islands
St. Helier Marina, Jersey
La Collette Marina, Jersey
Elizabeth Marina, Jersey
Beaucette Marina, Guernsey

United States

California
Woodley Island Marina, Humboldt Bay, Eureka
Downtown Shoreline Marina, Long Beach
Alamitos Bay Marina, Long Beach
Rainbow Harbor, Long Beach
Cerritos Bahia Marina, Long Beach
Marina Pacifica Boat Slips, Long Beach
Harborlight Landing At West Coast Hotel, Long Beach
Bar Harbor Anchorage, Marina del Rey
Bay Club Apartments & Marina, Marina del Rey
BoatYard Marina, Marina del Rey
Catalina Yacht Anchorage, Marina del Rey
Del Rey Yacht Club, Marina del Rey
Dock 77, Marina del Rey
Dolphin Marina, Marina del Rey
Holiday Harbor Marina, Marina del Rey
Marina City Club, Marina del Rey
Marina Harbor Apartments & Anchorage, Marina del Rey
Pier 44, Marina del Rey
Santa Monica Windjammers YC Marina, Marina del Rey
Tahiti Marina Apartments and Marina, Marina del Rey
Villa Del Mar Marina, Marina del Rey
Monterey Marina, Monterey
Newport Harbor, Newport Beach
Pier 39 Marina, San Francisco
Clipper Yacht Harbor, Sausalito
Channel Islands Marina, Ventura County
Marina Bay, Richmond
Berkeley Marina, Berkeley
Westpoint Harbor, Redwood City
Shelter Island Marina, San Diego

Connecticut
Cedar Island Marina
Deep River Marina

Florida
Angler's Marina, Clewiston
Bayshore Gardens Marina, Bayshore Gardens
Bahia Mar Yachting Center, Fort Lauderdale
Bird Key Yacht Club, Sarasota
Bradenton Beach Marina, Bradenton Beach
Cut's Edge Harbor Marina, Palmetto
Fisherman's Wharf Marina, Venice
Fort Myers Yacht Basin, Fort Myers
Hall of Fame Marina, Fort Lauderdale
Marina Jack's, Sarasota
Miami Beach Marina, Miami
Haulover Beach Park Marina, Miami
Longboat Key Club Moorings, Longboat Key
Loggerhead Club & Marina, Daytona Beach
Loggerhead Club & Marina, St. Pete Beach
Loggerhead Club & Marina, Lake Okeechobee
Loggerhead Club & Marina, Vero Beach
Loggerhead Club & Marina, Stuart
Loggerhead Club & Marina, Jupiter
Loggerhead Club & Marina, Palm Beach Gardens
Loggerhead Club & Marina, Riviera
Loggerhead Club & Marina, Lantana
Loggerhead Club & Marina, Hollywood
Loggerhead Club & Marina, S. Lantana
Loggerhead Club & Marina, Aventura
Loggerhead Club & Marina, South Miami
Palm View Marina, Rubonia
Riviera Dunes Marina, Palmetto
Safe Harbor Regatta Pointe, Palmetto
Sarasota Yacht Club, Sarasota
St Petersburg Municipal Marina, St Petersburg
Tarpon Marina, Venice
The Tarpon Club Marina, Naples
The Tierra Verde Marina, Tierra Verde
Tropic Isles Marina, Palmetto
Twin Dolphin Marina, Bradenton

Georgia
Florence Marina State Park

Kentucky
Ludlow-Bromley Yacht Club, Ludlow

Maryland
Baltimore Boating Center, Essex, Maryland|Essex

City Yacht Basin, Havre de Grace
Havre de Grace Marina, Havre de Grace
Log Pond Marina, Havre de Grace
Penn's Beach Marina, Havre de Grace
Sunset Harbor Marina, Essex
Tidewater Marina, Havre de Grace

Massachusetts
New Bedford, Massachusetts
Marina Bay (Quincy, Massachusetts)
Newburyport Marinas (Newburyport, Massachusetts)

Michigan
Drummond Island Yacht Haven, Drummond Island
George Kemp Marina, Sault Ste. Marie
Bay Harbor Marina, Bay City
Duncan Clinch Marina, Traverse City
Tri-Centennial State Park, Detroit (Detroit River)
Riverview Resort and Marina, Barbeau
Dewitt Marine, Bellaire

Minnesota
Watergate Marina, Saint Paul

Missouri
Lodge of Four Seasons Marina

New Jersey
Allen's Dock, New Gretna
Fair Lawn Marina, Fair Lawn
Frank S. Farley State Marina, Atlantic City
Green Cove Marina, Brick

New York
79th Street Boat Basin, Manhattan
Erie Basin Marina, Buffalo
World's Fair Marina, Queens
Anglers' Bay Marina, Cleveland, New York

Ohio
Forest City Yacht Club
Battery Park Marina
Cedar Point

Oklahoma 

 Alberta Creek Resort & Marina, Kingston

Oregon

Pier 39 Marina, Astoria
Port of Astoria Marina, Astoria
Port of Bandon, Bandon
Port of Brookings Harbor, Brookings
Charleston Marina, Charleston
Cove Palisades Marina (Lake Billy Chinook)
Port of The Dalles, The Dalles
Detroit Lake Marina, Detroit
West Lake Resort, Florence
Garibaldi Marina, Garibaldi
Jot's Resort, Gold Beach
Hood River Yacht Club, Hood River
Portland
Columbia Crossings
Columbia Ridge Marina
Sundance Yacht Marina
Jetty Fishery Marina, Rockaway
McCuddy's Marina, Scappoose
Loon Lake Watersports & Marina, Reedsport

Pennsylvania
Seven Points Marina, Raystown Lake, near Huntingdon

Puerto Rico
Puerto Del Rey Marina
Club Deportivo del Oeste
Club Náutico de Ponce

Rhode Island
Brewer Cove Haven Marina

Texas
Corpus Christi Marina, Corpus Christi
Sea Ranch Marina, South Padre Island

Virgin Islands
Yacht Haven Grande, Saint Thomas, USVI
Crown Bay Marina, Saint Thomas, USVI

Virginia
Washington Sailing Marina, Alexandria
 Smith Mountain Lake
Crystal Shores, Bedford County
Halesford Harbour, Bedford County
 Parkway Marina, Bedford County

Washington
Arabella's Landing Marina
Cap Sante Marina, Anacortes
Carillon Point Marina
Squalicum Harbor Marina, Bellingham
Blaine
Blaine Harbor Marina
Semiahmoo Marina
Eagle Harbor Marina
Port of Edmonds, Edmonds
Everett Bayside Marine, Everett
La Conner Marina
Port of Kalama, Kalama
Twin Bridges Marina, Mount Vernon
Makah Marina, Neah Bay
Oak Harbor Marina, Oak Harbor
Swantown Marina & Boatworks, Olympia
Skyline Marina
Port Ludlow Marina, Port Ludlow
Port Orchard Marina, Port Orchard
Point Roberts Marina Resort, Port Roberts, Point Roberts
Port of Poulsbo, Poulsbo
Port of Poulsbo, (Roche Harbor Resort & Marina), Roche
Seattle
Port of Seattle
Bell Harbor Marina
Harbor Island Marina
Shilshole Bay Marina
Elliott Bay Marina
Elliott Bay Yachting Center
Salmon Bay Marina and Boat Sales
John Wayne Marina, Sequim
Breakwater Marina, Tacoma
Chinook Landing Marina, Tacoma
Zittel's Marina

Washington, D.C.
Columbia Island Marina, Columbia Island
Gangplank Marina, Washington Channel, Washington, D.C. (Southwest)
James Creek Marina, Anacostia River, Washington, D.C. (Southwest)
Washington Marina, Washington Channel, Washington, D.C. (Southwest)

Wisconsin
Milwaukee
McKinley Marina

See also
List of seaports

References

External links

Lists of ports
Lists